David Timothy Clark (Tim Clark) is an American pastor and author. Formerly dean of students at Life Pacific College, he is now senior pastor of The Church On The Way in Van Nuys, California. In 2015, he published a devotional book on the Book of Acts called VIRAL.

Biography
Born in 1968, Tim Clark was raised attending Florence Avenue Foursquare Church in Santa Fe Springs, California. After high school, he felt called to youth ministry while working at The Church On The Way. He later helped plant a church in Fresno, California, received his bachelor's degree at Fresno Pacific University, planted a church in Seattle, and pastored Newberg Foursquare Church in Newberg, Oregon.

In 2007, Life Pacific College invited Clark to come on as dean of students, where he also served as adjunct professor and helped organize Lifehouse Foursquare Church in San Dimas, California. He received his master's degree from Vanguard University in 2010, and the following year he joined the Foursquare Church headquarters as Supervisor of the Greater Los Angeles District of Foursquare Churches.

In 2013, the Foursquare Church appointed Clark as the senior pastor of The Church On The Way. In 2015, he was invited to be a guest speaker at Converge 2015. He also published VIRAL, a 29-day devotional on the Book of Acts, to be made generally available in 2016.

Personal life
Clark and his wife, Deborah, live with their three children in Los Angeles, California.

Books
 VIRAL (2015)

References 

Pentecostal writers
1968 births
Living people
People from Van Nuys, Los Angeles
People from Santa Fe Springs, California
Members of the Foursquare Church
American Pentecostal pastors